Events from the year 1813 in Russia

Incumbents
 Monarch – Alexander I

Events

Births

Deaths

 
 
 
 Elizabeth Divov, courtier  (b. 1762)

References

1813 in Russia
Years of the 19th century in the Russian Empire